Subzi Mandi (vegetable market in Hindi) may refer to:

 Subzi Mandi railway station, in Delhi, India
 Sabzi Mandi (Karachi), a bazaar